'Matthew James Weigel is a Denesuline and Métis writer and artist from Canada, whose debut poetry collection Whitemud Walking was a finalist for the 2022 Dayne Ogilvie Prize for first works by LGBTQ Canadian writers.

He was born and raised in Edmonton, Alberta, where he is a graduate student in English and film studies at the University of Alberta. Whitemud Walking is a collection of poetry about indigenous peoples' relationship with wider Canadian society, based around the historical and geographic significance of Edmonton's Whitemud Creek.

He previously won the Vallum Chapbook Award in 2020 for his chapbook It Was Treaty / It Was Me.

In addition to his poetry, Weigel is a designer for the poetry publisher Moon Jelly House, and has created commissioned public artworks including Spirit of Treaty at the entrance to Edmonton's Spirit of Hope United Church, and The Magpie and the Buffalo Treaty in the city's Gold Bar Park.

References

External links

21st-century Canadian poets
21st-century Canadian artists
21st-century Canadian male writers
21st-century First Nations writers
Canadian male poets
Canadian male artists
Canadian muralists
Canadian graphic designers
Canadian LGBT poets
Canadian LGBT artists
LGBT First Nations people
First Nations artists
First Nations poets
Dene people
Artists from Edmonton
Writers from Edmonton
Living people
Year of birth missing (living people)
21st-century Canadian LGBT people